Joshua Thomas "J.T." Larson is an American politician and a Republican member of the Wyoming House of Representatives representing the 17th district since January 10, 2023.

Political career
Larson challenged incumbent Democratic representative Chad Banks, winning the Republican primary on August 16, 2022, unopposed. He then won the general election on November 8, 2022, defeating Banks with 61% of the vote.

References

External links
Profile from Ballotpedia

Living people
Republican Party members of the Wyoming House of Representatives
People from Rock Springs, Wyoming
21st-century American politicians
Year of birth missing (living people)